Great Busby is a village and civil parish in the Hambleton District of North Yorkshire, England. The population of the parish was estimated at 70 in 2013.

It is near the North York Moors and Stokesley. It is pronounced great 'Buzz - Bee'.

References

External links

Villages in North Yorkshire
Civil parishes in North Yorkshire